Nuñez Point is a point forming the west extremity of Takaki Promontory on Barison Peninsula on Graham Coast, Graham Land, in Antarctica.  Discovered by the French Antarctic Expedition, 1903–05, and named by Charcot for Captain Nuñez, Argentine Navy.

Maps

 British Antarctic Territory.  Scale 1:200000 topographic map. DOS 610 Series, Sheet W 65 64.  Directorate of Overseas Surveys, Tolworth, UK, 1971.

References
 SCAR Composite Gazetteer of Antarctica.

Headlands of Graham Land
Graham Coast